Delaware has 12 high schools with varsity ice hockey teams which participate in interscholastic competition. Unlike most other high school sports in the state, ice hockey is not sanctioned under the Delaware Interscholastic Athletic Association.  The state's main ice hockey league, the Delaware Scholastic Hockey Association, is sanctioned by USA Hockey.

Format 
All teams in Delaware play in the Delaware Scholastic Hockey Association, with the exception of Delaware Military Academy and Salesianum high school who plays in the AAA league in Pennsylvania's Inter County Scholastic Hockey League. The DSHA is broken down into two championship flights, and three divisions.  The top division makes up Flight A while the bottom two divisions make up Flight B.  Division 1 plays all their games against teams in the same division and teams from Division 2.  Division 2 plays games against teams from their own division and one game against each team from the other divisions.  Division 3 plays games against teams from their own division and division 2.  The league also holds an annual All-Star game, each team from all three divisions are represented by at least one player.

State Championship 
Delaware does not have an official state championship, because they are not officially sanctioned by the DIAA.  Starting in the 2006-2007 when the DSHA moved to a two flight system the league has produced two state champions.

Alumni 
While no player who has played hockey for a Delaware high school team has played in the NHL, Mark Eaton of the Pittsburgh Penguins went to Dickinson High School.  Also, many players have gone on to play at the college hockey level in the ACHA.

Delaware Ice Hockey Teams

References

External links
Delaware Scholastic Hockey Association
InterCounty Scholastic Hockey League

High school ice hockey in the United States
H
Ice hockey teams in Delaware